Aathrai Tribeni is a rural municipality (gaunpalika) out of eight rural municipality located in Taplejung District of Province No. 1 of Nepal. There are a total of 9 municipalities in Taplejung in which 1 is urban and 7 are rural.

The local body was formed by merging four VDCs namely Nighuradin, Fulbari, Hangpang, Change. Currently, it has a total of 5 wards. The population of the rural municipality is 13,784 according to the data collected on 2017 Nepalese local elections.

Population 
As per 2017, Aathrai Tribeni hosts a population of 13,784 across a total area of 88.83 km2.

See also
Taplejung District

References

Rural municipalities in Koshi Province
Rural municipalities in Taplejung District
Rural municipalities of Nepal established in 2017